Thalusia atrata' is a species of beetle in the family Cerambycidae. It was described by Melzer in 1918.

References

Rhopalophorini
Beetles described in 1918